John Whipple may refer to:
 John Adams Whipple, American inventor and early photographer
 John Whipple (settler), early settler of Dorchester in the Massachusetts Bay Colony